Chaudhary Digambar Singh (9 June 1913 at Kursanda Village, Mathura district – 10 December 1995) was member of 3rd Lok Sabha from Mathura in Uttar Pradesh State, India.

He was elected to 3rd,4th,7th Lok Sabha from Mathura.

1957 Lok Sabha Election
He contested in the 1957 Lok Sabha Elections from Mathura Lok Sabha constituency as the INC candidate and was defeated by the independent candidate Raja Mahendra Pratap.

References

1913 births
1995 deaths
People from Mathura district
India MPs 1962–1967
India MPs 1967–1970
India MPs 1980–1984
India MPs 1952–1957
Lok Sabha members from Uttar Pradesh
Indian National Congress politicians from Uttar Pradesh